The Big Star Parade (German: Die große Starparade) is a 1954 West German musical comedy film directed by Paul Martin and starring Adrian Hoven, Renate Holm and Gunther Philipp.

The film's sets were designed by the art director Hans Jürgen Kiebach and Gabriel Pellon. It was shot at the Spandau Studios and on location in Bavaria and Hamburg.

Cast

References

Bibliography
Hannah Durkin. Josephine Baker and Katherine Dunham: Dances in Literature and Cinema. University of Illinois Press, 2019.

External links

1954 musical comedy films
German musical comedy films
West German films
Films directed by Paul Martin
Gloria Film films
Films shot at Spandau Studios
German black-and-white films
1950s German-language films
1950s German films